Adolf Lantz (1882-1949) was an Austrian screenwriter. Lantz went into exile following the Nazi takeover of power in Germany, and died in London.

Selected filmography
 Ilona (1921)
 The Inheritance of Tordis (1921)
 Tabitha, Stand Up (1922)
 One Glass of Water (1923)
 The Countess of Paris (1923)
 Dangerous Clues (1924)
 Spring Awakening (1924)
 Man Against Man (1924)
 Dancing Mad (1925)
 The Morals of the Alley (1925)
 The Elegant Bunch (1925)
 Rags and Silk (1925)
 The Director General (1925)
 The Telephone Operator (1925)
 The Golden Butterfly (1926)
 State Attorney Jordan (1926)
 The Queen of the Baths (1926)
 The Divorcée (1926)
 Unmarried Daughters (1926)
 Sword and Shield (1926)
 Madame Wants No Children (1926)
 The Prince's Child (1927)
 The Ghost Train (1927)
 Number 17 (1928)
 The Devious Path (1928)
 Song (1928)
 Tragedy of Youth (1929)
 The Flame of Love (1930)
 Elisabeth of Austria (1931)
 Her Majesty the Barmaid (1931)
 His Highness Love (1931)
 That's All That Matters (1931)
 A Night in Paradise (1932)
 Rasputin, Demon with Women (1932)
 Kochaj tylko mnie (1935)
 Crossroads (1938)

Bibliography
 Prawer, S.S. Between Two Worlds: The Jewish Presence in German and Austrian Film, 1910-1933. Berghahn Books, 2007.

External links

1882 births
1949 deaths
Austrian male screenwriters
Austrian Jews
Film people from Vienna
Jewish emigrants from Austria to the United Kingdom after the Anschluss
20th-century Austrian screenwriters
20th-century Austrian male writers